The 1937 All-Ireland Senior Football Championship Final was the fiftieth All-Ireland Final and the deciding match of the 1937 All-Ireland Senior Football Championship, an inter-county Gaelic football tournament for the top teams in Ireland.

The Radio Athlone commentator mistakenly announced Cavan as the winners of the first game; Packie Boylan's late point had been disallowed. Kerry won the replay by six points, with goals by Timmy O'Leary (2), Miko Doyle and John Joe Landers.

It was the fourth of five All-Ireland football titles won by Kerry in the 1930s.

References

All-Ireland Senior Football Championship Final
All-Ireland Senior Football Championship Final, 1937
All-Ireland Senior Football Championship Finals
Cavan county football team matches
Kerry county football team matches